San Nicolas is one of the sixteen districts in the city of Manila in the Philippines. It is located at the west central part of the city, on the northern bank of the Pasig River bounded by the districts of Binondo to the east by Estero de Binondo, and Tondo to the north and west, and by the Pasig River to the south. Considered as a heritage district of Manila, this community has kept its 19th-century ancestral houses, which symbolizes the wealthy lives of the people who used to live there, similar to the ancestral houses of Silay and Vigan.

As of the May 1, 2020, national census, the population of San Nicolas, which is composed of 15 barangays named as numbers from 268 to 276 and from 281 to 286, is 42,957. This is slightly lower than the 2010 census that counted San Nicolas residents at 44,241.

History
San Nicolas was originally a fishing town named Baybay, which is also a Tagalog word for shore. It was renamed to San Nicolas, after the patron saint of sailors, boatmen, and mariners. San Nicolas is the western part of the first Chinatown in the Philippines, and perhaps the world; the eastern part is Binondo, which was founded in 1594 by Governor-General Luis Pérez Dasmariñas. The Dominican order came to western part of Chinatown in 1596 and then founded San Nicolas in 1598. This was the first mission by the Dominicans outside Intramuros.

In 1901, during the American colonization of the Philippines, San Nicolas became a district of the newly chartered city of Manila as its borders were extended outside the walled city presently known as Intramuros. Daniel Burnham, an American architect and urban planner, was commissioned to build a Plan of Manila. The result of the plan was the making of places and parishes that included San Nicolas. In modern times, San Nicolas is one of the administrative districts of Manila and part of the third legislative district of Manila. It became an extension of the Filipino-Chinese community in Binondo.

Barangays

Barangays 268, 269, 270, 271, 272, 273, 274, 275, and 276 are part of Zone 25; and Barangays 281, 282, 283, 284, 285, and 286 are part of Zone 26.

List of cultural properties of San Nicolas 

|}

In art 
Barrio de San Nicolas—Calle de Ylang-Ylang, watercolor by José Honorato Lozano, n.d.

Gallery

See also
San Nicolas Fire Station, Manila

References

 
Districts of Manila